The deputy secretary of energy is a high-ranking position within the United States Department of Energy. The Deputy Secretary is the second-highest-ranking official of the Department and assists the secretary of energy in the supervision and direction of the Department. The Deputy Secretary succeeds the Secretary in their absence, sickness, or unavailability.

The Deputy Secretary is appointed by the President with the consent of the United States Senate to serve at the request of the President. 

The current Deputy Secretary is David Turk who was confirmed by the Senate by a vote of 98-2 on March 24, 2021.

History 
The position of deputy secretary of energy was formed on October 1, 1977, with the creation of the Department of Energy when President Jimmy Carter signed the Department of Energy Organization Act.

Deputy secretaries of energy

References 

 
Energy